Year 987 (CMLXXXVII) was a common year starting on Saturday (link will display the full calendar) of the Julian calendar.

Events 
 By place 

 Byzantine Empire 
 February 7 – Bardas Phokas (the Younger) and Bardas Skleros, two members of the military elite, begin a wide-scale rebellion against Emperor Basil II. They overrun Anatolia, and Phokas declares himself Emperor. Basil applies for military assistance from Prince Vladimir the Great, ruler of Kievan Rus', who agrees to help him and sends a Varangian army (6,000 men).

 Europe 
 Al-Mansur, the de facto ruler of Al-Andalus, occupies the city of Coimbra (modern Portugal).
 December – The 15-year-old Robert (the son of Hugh Capet) is crowned co-ruler of France around Christmas at Orléans.
 The population of Bari revolts against the Byzantine Empire.

 Africa 
 The Zirid Dynasty fails to reconquer the western part of the Maghreb (Land of Atlas), which they have recently lost to the Umayyad Caliphate.

Births 
 Al-Mahdi al-Husayn, Zaidi imam of Yemen (d. 1013)
 Ibn Hayyan, Moorish writer and historian (d. 1075)
 Li, imperial consort of the Song Dynasty (d. 1032)
 Liu Yong, Chinese poet of the Song Dynasty (d. 1053)

Deaths 
 January 10 – Pietro I Orseolo, doge of Venice (b. 928)
 March 30 – Arnulf II (the Younger), Frankish nobleman
 May 21 – Louis V, king of the West Frankish Kingdom 
 July 13 – Abu'l-Fawaris Ahmad ibn Ali, Ikhshidid governor
 July 21 – Geoffrey I (Greymantle), Frankish nobleman
 September 8 (approximate date) – Adalbert I, Count of Vermandois, Frankish nobleman 
 November 16 – Shen Lun, Chinese scholar-official

References